Interstate 90 (I-90) is a transcontinental Interstate Highway that runs east–west across the northern United States. After traveling through the Silver Valley along the Coeur d'Alene River in the Bitterroot Range, I-90 crosses into Montana at Lookout Pass.

I-90 was created by the federal government in 1957, following the general route of U.S. Route 10 (US 10) and the mid-19th century Mullan Road constructed by the U.S. Army. The freeway was constructed in stages between 1960 and 1992.

Route description

The freeway travels northeast through the Rathdrum Prairie and into the outskirts of Post Falls, passing several retailers and a business park along the Spokane River. I-90 continues east along the river, paralleled to the south by the North Idaho Centennial Trail and a section of the BNSF Railway, and passes near the eponymous Post Falls and the city's downtown, served by a signed business route. The freeway intersects State Highway 41 (SH-41) and continues through the city's eastern residential neighborhoods and passes the nearby town of Huetter. I-90 then reaches Coeur d'Alene, the largest city in northern Idaho, and intersects a business route and US-95, the state's main north–south highway, near the Kootenai Medical Center.

The freeway travels around the north and east sides of central Coeur d'Alene, intersecting several local streets in the process, and turns southeast towards Fernan Lake and Lake Coeur d'Alene on the Spokane River. I-90 ascends Potlatch Hill and makes several stair-step turns to follow the northern shore of Lake Coeur d'Alene while traversing several forested hills. It passes  over a valley overlooking Bennett Bay on the Veterans Memorial Centennial Bridge, a high concrete bridge that was completed in 1987. The freeway descends from the hills and travels southeasterly along Wolf Lodge Bay, passing Coeur d'Alene Parkway State Park and intersecting the northern terminus of the Lake Coeur d'Alene Scenic Byway (SH-97) at the east end of the lake.

From the summit, I-90 continues southeast along Fourth of July Canyon towards the Coeur d'Alene River valley and intersects SH-3 near Rose Lake. The freeway bends northward around a hill and travels east into the river valley, passing Cataldo and the Old Mission State Park, home to the state's oldest standing building. In Cataldo, it also crosses the river and the Trail of the Coeur d'Alenes, a major rail trail that follows the highway into the Bitterroot Range. I-90 crosses into Shoshone County, one of only two counties along the highway within Idaho, and continues along the north sides of Pinehurst and Smelterville, passing the Shoshone County Airport at the latter. The freeway travels southeasterly through Kellogg, passing the Silver Mountain Resort and its ski gondola, and continues around the towns of Osburn and Silverton along the north bank of the South Fork Coeur d'Alene River at the bottom of the narrow Silver Valley. I-90 also intersects a set of business routes in Osburn and Silverton that loop back to the freeway.

The freeway turns east in the town of Wallace, also served by its own business route, and travels to the north of downtown on an elevated viaduct cut into a nearby hill. At the east end of Wallace, I-90 intersects SH-4, which connects to the ghost town of Burke. The highway continues along the south side of the river and Trail of the Coeur d'Alenes as it ascends further into the mountains and meanders around hills and gulches. The trail ends at the town of Mullan, named for road-building U.S. Army captain John Mullan and home to a business route, and I-90 continues east along the Northern Pacific Trail. The freeway travels uphill from the river along a southern ridge and passes a scenic viewpoint commemorating the 1903 Willow Creek avalanche. The freeway continues into Montana and travels through the cities of Missoula, Butte, Bozeman, and Billings.

I-90 is the only Interstate in northern Idaho and a major east–west route, forming part of a transcontinental highway. At , it is the second-shortest mainline Interstate in the state, after Interstate 86, and the third-longest. The entire highway was designated as the Purple Heart Trail by the state legislature in 2008. The Idaho section of I-90 is maintained by the Idaho Transportation Department (ITD), which conducts an annual survey of traffic on certain highway segments that is expressed in terms of average annual daily traffic (AADT), a measure of traffic volume for any average day of the year. Traffic volumes on I-90 ranged from a minimum of 7,861 near Mullan and 60,729 in Huetter on an average day in 2017.

History

Interstate 90 from Coeur d'Alene to Lookout Pass roughly follows the route of the Mullan Road, constructed in 1859–60 by the U.S. Army and civilian volunteers led by captain John Mullan. Mullan received a series of appropriations from U.S. Congress from 1855 to 1860, totaling $230,000, to build the first engineered road west of the Mississippi River and connect Fort Walla Walla to Fort Benton. The road also followed the Coeur d'Alene River and its south fork, which was long used by the Coeur d'Alene people to visit hunting grounds in modern-day Montana.

The Idaho state government designated Route 2, the North Pacific Highway, between the Washington border and St. Regis Pass as part of its original numbered highway system in 1914. Other sections of I-90 were built over the Yellowstone Trail and U.S. Route 10, though some parts of I-90 were cut as new roadway. The link from Post Falls to the Washington state border was completed in 1972 at a cost of $1.1 million to upgrade the existing road and build a new bridge over the Spokane River.

The small town of Wallace in the Silver Valley still prides itself on having what was the last stoplight on I-90. Its downtown has many historical buildings, which would have been wiped out by the original planned route of the freeway, so in 1976, city leaders had the downtown placed on the National Register of Historic Places. Alternatives discussed in 1963 included tunnels and twin levels.

As a result, the federal government was forced at great expense to reroute the freeway to the northern edge of downtown and elevate it. Work on that section was resumed in 1984, and it opened in September 1991. A bicycle path is routed beneath part of that segment. Before the move to the viaduct, I-90 went from a freeway at the western edge of Wallace, then turned to surface streets and followed the main arterial as U.S. Route 10 through town, which included the last stoplight on I-90 between Seattle and Boston. Upon reaching the eastern edge of the town it became a limited access divided highway once again.

The interstate also was routed along Lake Coeur d'Alene as a surface street before the Veterans Memorial Centennial Bridge was completed in 1992, traveling further above the lake.

Exit list

Related routes

 
 U.S. Route 10

References

 Idaho
90
Transportation in Kootenai County, Idaho
Transportation in Shoshone County, Idaho